Non-mycosis fungoides CD30− cutaneous large T-cell lymphoma is a cutaneous condition that usually presents as solitary or generalized plaques, nodules, or tumors of short duration.

See also 
 Cutaneous T-cell lymphoma
 CD30+ cutaneous T-cell lymphoma

References 

Lymphoid-related cutaneous conditions
Lymphoma